Ron Francis may refer to:
Ron Francis, ice hockey player
Ronald Francis, often known as Ron Francis, artist
Ron Francis (American football) (born 1964), American football player